Romeo Juliet is a 2015 Indian Tamil-language romantic comedy film written and directed by Lakshman in his directorial debut. The film stars Jayam Ravi and Hansika Motwani, with music composed by D. Imman. The title alludes to William Shakespeare play Romeo and Juliet though the film not based on it. The film was released on 12 June 2015.

Plot 
Aishwarya (Hansika) is an airhostess who grew up at an orphanage. Growing up deprived of money, she believes that marrying into a rich family is the only way she can find happiness in life. She falls in love with Kartik (Jayam Ravi) assuming he is rich, but once she realises he is just a gym instructor, she leaves him. Although Kartik tries to convince Aishwarya that love can work out even without riches, Aishwarya is adamant that she wants a rich husband and humiliates Kartik in various ways.
Subsequently, Aishwarya manages to get into a relationship with a rich man Arjun (Vamsi Krishna), and his family has agreed to their wedding. But Kartik contacts her, threatening to break her relationship with Arjun. With Kartik standing in her way and threatening to break her relationship with Arjun, Aishwarya is forced to find a suitable girl for Kartik and after so many failed attempts, finds Nisha (Poonam Bajwa) for him. Kartik and Nisha gets along well and gets into a happy relationship. Meanwhile as her marriage date with Arjun is approaching, Aishwarya soon gets disturbed and suffocated with the heavily restricted although rich lifestyle given by Arjun and his family. One day when she meets Karthik at a temple, Kartik tells her that his engagement with Nisha is going to happen the night before Valentine's Day. At the same time, Arjun and his family plans to have Arjun and Aishwarya's wedding in London and the flight is scheduled for the night before Valentine's Day. On the night Aishwarya is supposed to leave, she realises that she does not want to live the heavily restricted and robotic life with Arjun and tells him she wants to leave. Arjun tells her okay from now on neither he nor his family members will try to control anything about her, and questions her if now is she okay about marrying him. When Aishwarya appears hesitant, Arjun firmly questions her to open up and she says she loves Kartik. Arjun stops the car and asks her to get out and not come into his life again. Crying, she goes to the place where Kartik and Nisha are going to get engaged. She professes her love to Kartik but Kartik refuses and leaves the place with Nisha, but then a song plays, and Kartik reveals that the relationship between Kartik and Nisha was a play orchestrated by Nisha and him to make Aishwarya realise her mistake and also realise her love for him. The story ends with Kartik and Aishwarya reunited.

Cast

Production 
Lakshman, who had previously ventured into films as producer of Kalvanin Kadhali (2006), announced that he would make his first venture as a director with a film titled Romeo Juliet featuring Jayam Ravi in the lead role. Despite its title, it is not based on the William Shakespeare play Romeo and Juliet. The director had initially finalised/convinced Nayantara to play the leading female role but did not want to repeat her pairing with Jayam Ravi, as the pair were working on another production, Raja's Thani Oruvan, at the time of casting. Subsequently, he chose to cast Hansika Motwani in a leading role instead. A photo shoot was then held and promotional stills featuring the lead pair were released to the media in late March 2014. Hansika revealed that she would play a girl with a "futuristic attitude", while Jayam Ravi's character would be more conservative in the romantic comedy.

The film's first official poster released on 14 April 2014 coinciding with Tamil New Years Day and indicated that filming had begun. The team held their first schedule in May 2014, with Poonam Bajwa joining the cast. The team shot a sequence where real life actors approach Jayam Ravi's character, a fitness trainer, to help them achieve six pack abs with Arya making a guest appearance.

The first look teaser was released on 29 December 2014 with only the lead cast appearing on it.

Soundtrack 
D. Imman composed the soundtrack album and score for the film. G. Rokesh, Madhan Karky and Thamarai wrote the lyrics.

Release 
The film was released worldwide 12 June 2015.The satellite rights of the film were sold to Sun TV.

Critical reception 
Baradwaj Rangan wrote, "The film is a disaster...it's impossible to digest the overall preposterousness...Romeo Juliet just cannot make up its mind whether it wants to be a screwball comedy or a melodrama — the tone is all over the place. And the writing is painfully inconsistent". The Times of India gave the film 2/5 and wrote, "here is a film that could prove to be a worthy challenger to Valiyavan for the title of the Most Preposterous Movie of the Year. Rediff also gave it 2/5 and wrote, "Lakshman's Romeo Juliet is just a rehash of old clichés. He pitches love against money and there are no prizes for guessing which one wins". Sify wrote, "Lakshman has packaged the film in a glossy manner but it is unable to find any spark or chemistry between the lead pair. His direction is amateurish and so are the characters half-baked. The best thing about Romeo Juliet is Jayam Ravi and Hansika who does their best to rise above the flawed script". The New Indian Express wrote, "The film, an average entertainer, would have been more engaging if only the screenplay had been coherent and the episodes interesting".

References

External links 
 
 

2015 films
2015 romantic comedy-drama films
Indian romantic comedy-drama films
2010s Tamil-language films
Films scored by D. Imman
2015 directorial debut films
2015 comedy-drama films